Mostafa Afzalifard (born 1961) is an Iranian politician.

Afzalifard was born in Ardabil. He is a member of the 9th Islamic Consultative Assembly from the electorate of Ardabil, Nir, Namin and Sareyn with Mansour Haghighatpour and Kamaladin Pirmoazzen. Afzalifard won with 75,799 (63.48%) votes.

References

People from Ardabil
Deputies of Ardabil, Nir, Namin and Sareyn
Living people
1961 births
Members of the 9th Islamic Consultative Assembly